Johann Baptist Heinefetter (2 April 1815 – 4 November 1902) was a German Romantic painter.

Life 
Heinefetters was born as the child of Jewish parents in Mainz. From the union of his father Christian Heinefetter (born 1772) and his mother Christine (née Seelandt) further children emerged, so the sisters Sabine, Eva, Fatime, Kathinka, Klara and Nanette, who were all opera singers. Together with Adolph Heinefetter the whole family took part in the opera The Magic Flute in Staatstheater Mainz in 1826.

In Munich Heinefetter became a pupil of the war artist Dietrich Monten. He was active as genre, landscape and occasionally also battle painter. He travelled to Italy, Southern France, Corsica, Switzerland, Tyrol as well as Austria, Upper Bavaria, the Black Forest and the Rhine-Main area and settled in Baden-Baden.

In 1842 he painted with Jakob Götzenberger the frescos of the Trinkhalle Baden-Baden, created the picture Resurrection of Christ for the cemetery chapel and in the  four large ceiling paintings. In Baden-Baden he founded a gymnastics club in 1847, to whose honorary member he was later appointed. In the 1850s he accompanied Götzenberger to England. Here they worked together for Francis Egerton, 1st Earl of Ellesmere, who let them decorate the Bridgewater House in the London St James's Park with pictures from the history of the house and scenes from Comus by John Milton.

He was painting teacher of the princesses Belosselski and the Gagarin family and the Duchess of Hamilton Princess Marie Amelie of Baden. Also Frederick I, Grand Duke of Baden showed interest in Heinefetter's works and visited the artist's studio several times. He acquired several large landscape paintings and appointed Heinefetter as Court painter.

Further reading 
 Johann Baptist Heinefetter. In: Hans Vollmer (edit.): Allgemeines Lexikon der Bildenden Künstler von der Antike bis zur Gegenwart. Established by Ulrich Thieme and Felix Becker. Volume 16: Hansen–Heubach. E. A. Seemann, Leipzig 1923.
 Johann Baptist Heinefetter. In: Hans Vollmer: Allgemeines Lexikon der bildenden Künstler des XX. Jahrhunderts. 6 volumes. E. A. Seemann, Leipzig 1953–1962.
 
  Johann Baptist Heinefetter. In: Joachim Busse: Internationales Handbuch aller Maler und Bildhauer des 19. Jahrhunderts. Busse-Verzeichnis. Busse, Wiesbaden 1977, .
 Johann Baptist Heinefetter. In: Emmanuel Bénézit: Dictionary of Artists. Volume 6, 2006,

External links 
 Johann Baptiste Heinefetter (German, 1815–1902). In: artnet, with pictures of Heinefetter's works.

References 

German landscape painters
German war artists
1815 births
1902 deaths
Artists from Mainz
19th-century German painters
19th-century German male artists
German male painters
19th-century German Jews
Jewish painters